"I Never Quite Got Back (From Loving You)" is a song recorded by American country music artist Sylvia.  It was released in December 1983 as the third single from the album Snapshot.  The song reached #3 on the Billboard Hot Country Singles & Tracks chart.  The song was written by Mike Reid and Don Pfrimmer.

Content
The songs narrator speaks of still being in love with a man who has left her for someone new.

Chart performance

References

1984 singles
Sylvia (singer) songs
Songs written by Don Pfrimmer
Songs written by Mike Reid (singer)
Song recordings produced by Tom Collins (record producer)
RCA Records singles
1983 songs